Marko Stanovčić (born 9 May 1990) is a Montenegrin football defender who plays for Serbian side Stepojevac Vaga.

References

External links
 
 Marko Stanovčić stats at utakmica.rs
 Marko Stanovčić stats at footballdatabase.eu

1990 births
Living people
Sportspeople from Cetinje
Association football defenders
Montenegrin footballers
FK Sinđelić Beograd players
FK Bežanija players
FK Smederevo players
FK Zemun players
FK Inđija players
FK Iskra Danilovgrad players
FK Donji Srem players
FK Sopot players
Serbian First League players
Serbian SuperLiga players
Montenegrin First League players
Montenegrin expatriate footballers
Expatriate footballers in Serbia
Montenegrin expatriate sportspeople in Serbia